Kirovohrad Oblast, also known as Kirovohradschyna, is an oblast (province) in central Ukraine. The administrative center of the oblast is the city of Kropyvnytskyi. Its population is  It is Ukraine's second least populated oblast, behind Chernivtsi.

In 2019, the Constitutional Court of Ukraine approved the change of the oblast's name to Kropyvnytskyi Oblast, or Kropyvnychchyna. The change is not yet implemented.

Geography

The city of Dobrovelychkivka is the geographical center of Ukraine.

History
The oblast was created as part of the Ukrainian SSR on January 10, 1939 out of the northern raions of Mykolaiv Oblast. In 1954, the oblast lost some raions to the newly created Cherkasy Oblast, but later that year received its western raions from the Odesa Oblast. 

Between 1939 and 2016, the oblast administrative center, Kropyvnytskyi, was called Kirovohrad and was named after the First Secretary of the Leningrad City Committee of the All-Union Communist Party (Bolsheviks) Sergei Kirov. Due to decommunization laws (on 14 July 2016) the name of the city was changed to Kropyvnytskyi. Kirovohrad Oblast was not renamed because as such it is mentioned in the Constitution of Ukraine, and the Oblast can only be renamed by a constitutional amendment by the Verkhovna Rada. 

On 20 June 2018, the Committee on State Building, Regional Policy and Local Self-Government of the Ukrainian parliament backed the proposal to rename Kirovohrad Oblast to Kropyvnytskyi Oblast. In February 2019, the Constitutional Court of Ukraine declared constitutional the bill on renaming Kirovohrad Oblast to Kropyvnytskyi Oblast. The renaming was supported by the local Oblast Council in March 2021. The process then stalled in the parliament, with the oblast council asking the Rada to speed up the process in September 2022.

Points of interest
The following sites were nominated for the Seven Wonders of Ukraine:
 Khutir Nadia

Administrative divisions

Before the July 2020 reform, Kirovohrad Oblast was administratively subdivided into 21 raions (districts) as well as 4 cities (municipalities) which were directly subordinate to the oblast government: Oleksandriia, Svitlovodsk, Znamianka, and the administrative center of the oblast, Kropyvnytskyi.

Note: Asterisks (*) Though the administrative center of the rayon was housed in the city/town that it was named after, cities do not answer to the rayon authorities only towns do; instead they were directly subordinated to the oblast government and therefore were not counted as part of rayon statistics.

Demographics

Age structure
 0-14 years: 14.3%  (male 72,646/female 68,970)
 15-64 years: 68.7%  (male 324,698/female 355,058)
 65 years and over: 17.0%  (male 55,718/female 111,666) (2013 official)

Median age
 total: 41.2 years 
 male: 37.7 years 
 female: 44.5 years  (2013 official)

Nomenclature
Most of Ukraine's oblasts are named after their capital cities, officially referred to as "oblast centers" (translit. oblasnyi tsentr). The name of each oblast is a relative adjective, formed by adding a feminine suffix to the name of the respective center city: Kirovohrad was the former name of the center of the Kirovohrads’ka oblast’ (Kirovohrad Oblast). Most oblasts are also sometimes referred to in a feminine noun form, following the convention of traditional regional place names, ending with the suffix "-shchyna", as is the case with the Kirovohrad Oblast, Kirovohradshchyna.

See also
 Administrative divisions of Ukraine

References

External links
 

 
Oblasts of Ukraine
States and territories established in 1939
Soviet toponymy in Ukraine
1939 establishments in Ukraine